Cameleon is an engineered protein based on variant of green fluorescent protein used to visualize calcium levels in living cells. It is a genetically encoded calcium sensor created by Roger Y. Tsien and coworkers. The name is a conflation of CaM (the common abbreviation of calmodulin) and chameleon to indicate the fact that the sensor protein undergoes a conformation change and radiates at an altered wavelength upon calcium binding to the calmodulin element of the Cameleon. Cameleon was the first genetically encoded calcium sensor that could be used for ratiometric measurements and the first to be used in a transgenic animal to record activity in neurons and muscle cells.  Cameleon and other genetically-encoded calcium indicators (GECIs) have found many applications in neuroscience and other fields of biology. It was created by fusing BFP, calmodulin, calmodulin-binding peptide M13 and EGFP.

Mechanism 
The DNA encoding cameleon fusion protein must be either stably or transiently introduced into the cell of interest. Protein made by the cell according to this DNA information then serves as a fluorescent indicator of calcium concentration. In the presence of calcium, Ca2+ binds to M13, which enables calmodulin to wrap around the M13 domain. This brings the two GFP-variant proteins closer to each other, which increases FRET efficiency between them.

References

Sensors
Engineered proteins
Fluorescent proteins
Cell imaging
Calcium signaling